Adjetey Anang (born 8 July 1973) is a Ghanaian actor, popularly known as "Pusher", which was his screen name in the television series Things We Do for Love. He has featured in many Ghanaian movies, including Deadly Voyage, A Sting in a Tale, The Perfect Picture and others. He has also featured in a Dutch movie titled Slavery.

Education 
Adjetey Anang studied at Labone Senior High School and proceeded to the University of Ghana, where he studied Fine Arts. He went further to study his masters in Dramatic Arts at Wits University in Johannesburg.

Career 
Anang has starred in the Ghanaian TV series Yolo  which advises and directs the youth on adolescence, etc.

Personal life 
Anang is married to Elom Anang and they have a son.

Filmography 
Broken Heart (1999)
 Things We Do For Love (2000)
Life and Living it (2009) 
The Perfect Picture(2009)
A sting in a tale(2009)
Adams Apples :The Family Ties (2011)
Adams Apples :Musical Chairs (2011)
Adams Apples :Torn (2011)
Adam Apples :Twisted connections(2011)
Adams Apples :Duplicity (2011)
Adams Apples :Confessions (2011)
Adams Apples :Showdown(2011)
Adams Apples :Fight or Flight (2012)
Adams Apples :New Beginnings (2012)
Adams Apples :Rescue Mission (2012)
The pledge :Ghana will not burn (2012)
Potomanto (2013)
Double Cross (2014)
Devil in the Detail(2014)
Kintampo (2017)
Sink or Swim :The Perilous Journey (2017)
Potomanto
My Very Ghanaian Wedding (2017)
Potato Potahto (2017)
Keteke (2017)
Sidechic Gang (2018)
Yolo
Sin City 
Sugar
Gold Coast Lounge (2019)
Citation (2020)
Aloe Vera (2020)
Our Jesus Story (2020)
”Dede”

Awards 
Adjetey Anang has won himself a lot of fans from his role in Things We Do For Love. He has also won awards including An Arts Critique and Review Association of Ghana (ACRAG) Talent Award and A Ghana Union of Theatre Societies (GUTS) Best Actor Award. He was nominated in the Best Supporting Actor category in the 8th Africa Magic Viewers' Choice Awards for his role in Gold Coast Lounge. He was won the Actor of the year  at the 2022 Exclusive Men of the Year Africa Awards.

References

External links

Ghanaian male film actors
Best Supporting Actor Africa Movie Academy Award winners
1973 births
Living people
21st-century Ghanaian male actors